Arrayán was a Spanish TV soap opera which was aired on Canal Sur.
It became the longest running soap opera in Spanish television history, more than 2.400 episodes were aired between 2001 and 2013. The duration of each episode was about 25 to 30 minutes and was aired from Monday to Thursday at 21.45 h.

Plot
The story takes place in an existing luxury hotel in a fictional town but is filmed in Coin (Malaga) on the Andalusian coast, called "Hotel Arrayan". Germán Santisteban, its creator and director for decades, will retire; however, he is assassinated. This starts a chain of events.
Although the plot of the series changed a lot, the series continues to show everyday life in the hotel, the lives of their workers and the relationship with other employees and with customers.

Every season shows new characters and situations, serving as a springboard for many Andalusian actors, as well as enjoying the participation of renowned actors of Spanish national scene, hailing both from Andalusia and elsewhere.

On January 9, 2013 the last 5 episodes of the series were issued, putting an end to the second long-running series of television in Spain so far, after the Basque Goenkale

Cast

Main cast

Recurrent cast

Success
The series became a success since its early chapters. And it retained high ratings throughout its path. According to its creators, the key weeas to have frames where a contemporary and urban Andalusia was drawn. These frames run through topics such as drugs, crime, immigration, human and romantic relationships, etc. Test of its success is receiving several awards, the most prominent being the Ondas Award for Best Spanish 2005 series "for being a pioneer in the genre of daily television drama in prime time with an outstanding success".

Cancellation
In July 2012 Radio y Televisión de Andalucía announced that due to budget cuts in the entity Arrayán will be canceled. On January 9, 2013 the last 5 episodes were aired.

References

Spanish television soap operas
2001 Spanish television series debuts
2013 Spanish television series endings
2000s Spanish drama television series
2010s Spanish drama television series